Lieutenant-General William Seymour (8 February 1664 – 9 or 10 February 1728) was a British soldier and politician. He was the second son of Sir Edward Seymour, 4th Baronet, the prominent Tory. He served successively as Member of Parliament for Cockermouth, Totnes and Newport, Isle of Wight.

On 3 October 1694, he took command as Colonel of the former Lord Cutts' Regiment of Foot. It was converted to a Marine regiment on 31 July 1698; he remained in command until it was disbanded on 20 May 1699. From 1 March 1701 until 12 February 1702 he was Colonel of the former Sir Edward Dering's Regiment of Foot, and was then appointed Colonel of The Queen's Regiment of Foot. He commanded it until 25 December 1717; it was a Marine regiment from 1703 until 1710. On 1 June 1702, he was appointed Brigadier-General of the Marine Regiments, which had that year been reformed for the War of the Spanish Succession.

References

External links
regiments.org

1664 births
1728 deaths
British Army generals
Royal Marines generals
South Wales Borderers officers
King's Own Royal Regiment officers
Members of Parliament for the Isle of Wight
Younger sons of baronets
English MPs 1698–1700
English MPs 1702–1705
British MPs 1710–1713
Members of the Parliament of England (pre-1707) for Totnes